Spirorbula squalida is a species of air-breathing land snails, terrestrial pulmonate gastropod mollusks in the family Geomitridae, the hairy snails and their allies. 

This species is endemic to Portugal.  Its natural habitat is rocky areas; it is threatened by habitat loss.

References

 Bank, R. A.; Neubert, E. (2017). Checklist of the land and freshwater Gastropoda of Europe. Last update: July 16th, 2017.
 Cameron, R. A. D., Teixeira, D., Pokryszko, B., Silva, I. & Groh, K. (2021). An annotated checklist of the extant and Quaternary land molluscs of the Desertas Islands, Madeiran Archipelago. Journal of Conchology. 44(1): 53-70.

External links
 Lowe, R. T. (1852). Brief diagnostic notices of new Maderan land shells. The Annals and Magazine of Natural History. (2) 9 (50): 112-120; (2) 9 (52): 275-279. London

Molluscs of Madeira
Spirorbula
Gastropods described in 1852
Taxonomy articles created by Polbot